Eric Thomas Williams (born February 21, 1960 in Raleigh, North Carolina) is a former American football safety in the National Football League. He was drafted by the Pittsburgh Steelers in the sixth round of the 1983 NFL Draft. He played college football at North Carolina State.

Williams also played for the Detroit Lions.

He was a 1978 graduate of Garner Magnet High School in Garner, North Carolina and was inducted into the high school's hall of fame in 2012.

References

1960 births
Living people
Players of American football from Raleigh, North Carolina
American football safeties
NC State Wolfpack football players
Pittsburgh Steelers players
Detroit Lions players
Garner Magnet High School alumni